2-Phenylindole is an organic compound. It is the parent structure of a group of nonsteroidal selective estrogen receptor modulators (SERMs) that includes zindoxifene, bazedoxifene, and pipendoxifene, as well as the nonsteroidal estrogen D-15414 (the major metabolite of zindoxifene).

References

Indoles